Fernando Londoño Hoyos (born 27 December 1944) is a Colombian politician, lawyer, and economist. A longtime member of the Colombian Conservative Party, Londoño served as the 1st Minister of the Interior and Justice of Colombia from 2002 to 2004 during the Administration of President Álvaro Uribe Vélez.

Londoño has worked as a journalist since being removed from government for corruption. He is a columnist and opinion writer for several Colombian newspapers. He also hosts a radio talk show, La Hora de la Verdad.

Londoño was wounded in a targeted bombing in Bogotá on 15 May 2012. Two people on a motorbike attached an explosive device to his car shortly before the explosion. Londoño survived the terrorist attack, but the blast killed his driver and a police escort.  The attack, which took place in Bogota's financial district, injured twenty bystanders.

He has been found guilty and sentenced in two occasions in cases dealing with corruption and insider trading. He was banned from holding public office for 12 years.

Personal life
Londoño was born on 27 December 1944 in Manizales to Fernando Londoño y Londoño and Melba Hoyos Botero. He attended the prestigious San Bartolomé La Merced School in Bogotá where he finished his primary and secondary studies, and latter attended the Pontifical Xavierian University where he graduated in 1967 with a Bachelor of Laws. On 7 December 1968 Londoño married colleague and fellow alumni, Patricia, He remarried in 1978, this time to María Margarita Camargo Espinosa. From his first marriage he had two daughters, Cristina (b 1969) and Rosario (b 1971); from his second and current marriage he has one daughter, Tatiana (b 1979), and one son, Fernando (b 1981).

Career

Minister of the Interior and Justice
On 12 July 2002, then President-elect Álvaro Uribe Vélez ratified Londoño as his choice for Minister of the Interior. Upon taking office on 7 August 2002, Uribe sworn in his new Cabinet and Londoño as the 8th Minister of the Interior entrusting him with the Ministry of Justice and Law as well. He remained in that post until the ministries were reorganized and consolidated together to form the Ministry of the Interior and Justice, and Londoño reappointed as its 1st Minister.

Selected works

References

External links
 La Hora de la Verdad

1944 births
Living people
People from Manizales
Pontifical Xavierian University alumni
20th-century Colombian lawyers
Colombian economists
Academic staff of the Pontifical Xavierian University
Colombian Conservative Party politicians
Colombian Ministers of the Interior
Colombian Ministers of the Interior and Justice
Colombian columnists
Colombian radio presenters
Colombian politicians